Donacia antiqua is a species of leaf beetles of the subfamily Donaciinae. They are found mainly in Estonia, Finland Latvia and Sweden, and specimens have been found in Central Europe and France.

References

Donaciinae
Beetles described in 1818
Beetles of Europe
Taxa named by Gustav Kunze